Michael Anthony Franano (born 1964) is an American rock singer/songwriter and musician known for his work in the hard rock and alternative genres.

History
In 1989–90, Michael Anthony Franano achieved commercial success as singer/songwriter of The Front, a band originally from Kansas City, Missouri.  After the CBS release of their self-titled album, and single, Fire reached number 29 on the Billboard Rock charts. He has since released two more albums.  The first was after The Front changed their name to Bakers Pink and released a self-titled album on Epic Records in 1993. He released a solo album in 1998 on Mutiny Records (Warner/Sire) under the name Michael Moon. The Michael Moon Band (credited as Michael Moon/El Flamingo Band) had a cameo appearance in the Woody Allen / Miramax film, Celebrity, performing the single Chanel No. 5 in a club scene while Kenneth Branagh dances with Charlize Theron.  Michael is also credited for writing, composing and performing the music on Lynn's Wake, an independent film and Winner of the Best Short Screenplay in the Atlantic City Film Festival in 1999, as well as writing songs featured in the television shows Party of Five and Melrose Place. Michael continues to write and record and is currently working on new material.

Discography

Studio albums

Singles

References

External links
Michael Anthony Franano's official website

1964 births
American male singer-songwriters
American rock songwriters
American rock singers
American rock guitarists
American male guitarists
Musicians from Kansas City, Missouri
Singer-songwriters from New York (state)
American people of Italian descent
Living people
Singer-songwriters from Missouri
Guitarists from Missouri
Guitarists from New York (state)
20th-century American guitarists
20th-century American male musicians